Arinadtha "Mint" Chavatanont (born 15 September 1992) is a Thai equestrian. She represented Thailand at the 2020 Summer Olympics, competing in  individual and team eventing on her horse Boleybawn Prince. It was the first time a team from Thailand qualified for Eventing at an Olympic Games. She was eliminated due to a crash during the cross country phase.

Chavatanont competed internationally in dressage and show jumping before changing to eventing in 2016.

References 

1992 births
Living people
Arinadtha Chavatanont
Event riders
Arinadtha Chavatanont
Arinadtha Chavatanont
Arinadtha Chavatanont
Equestrians at the 2020 Summer Olympics
Equestrians at the 2018 Asian Games
Arinadtha Chavatanont
Arinadtha Chavatanont
Asian Games medalists in equestrian
Medalists at the 2018 Asian Games
Competitors at the 2011 Southeast Asian Games
Competitors at the 2017 Southeast Asian Games
Southeast Asian Games medalists in equestrian
Arinadtha Chavatanont
Arinadtha Chavatanont
Arinadtha Chavatanont